The Great Brăila Island is an island on the Danube river in the Brăila County, Romania.

On the island there are two communes, Frecăței and Mărașu, which have about 5,000 inhabitants. In the southwest is the village of Mărașu.

There was a series of swamps – Brăila Pond (Romanian: Balta Brăilei), until the Communist regime drained them and built dams using forced labour of political detainees and transformed it to an agricultural area. There were  "re-education camps" at Grădina, Ostrov, Bandoiu, Lunca, Salcia, Stoienești, and Strâmba Veche. The terrain proved to be fertile and it was declared a "success of Communism in Romania".

In 2018, it was announced that Hamdan Bin Zayed Al Nahyan, an investor from the United Arab Emirates, had purchased 57,000 hectares on the Island for agricultural development.

Balta Mică a Brăilei Natural Park is base on the Small Brăila Island.

Notes

References 
 Ediție Specială, 26 July 2005 (part 1), (part 2)
 Jurnalul Național, 4 August 2005, Bărăganul dintre brațele Dunării

See also
 

Geography of Brăila County
Islands of the Danube
River islands of Romania
Brăila